Yalutorovsk is a town in Tyumen Oblast, Russia, located on the Tobol River  southeast of Tyumen. Population:

History
It was founded in 1659 as the settlement of Yalutorovsky and was granted town status in 1782.

Administrative and municipal status
Within the framework of administrative divisions, it serves as the administrative center of Yalutorovsky District, even though it is not a part of it. As an administrative division, it is incorporated separately as the Town of Yalutorovsk—an administrative unit with the status equal to that of the districts. As a municipal division, the Town of Yalutorovsk is incorporated as Yalutorovsk Urban Okrug.

See also
Savva Mamontov

References

Notes

Sources

Cities and towns in Tyumen Oblast
Yalutorovsky Uyezd